Fergus Feehily (born 1968) is an Irish artist.

Feehily was born in Dublin the youngest of five children. He studied at Dún Laoghaire College of Art and Design (now known as Dún Laoghaire Institute of Art, Design and Technology). In the late 1990s he received the Monbusho Scholarship from the Japanese Ministry of Education to study at Tokyo National University of Fine Arts and Music.

Feehily is represented by MISAKO & ROSEN, Tokyo and [https://www.christianlethert.com/en/artists/fergus-feehily/ Galerie Christian Lethert, Cologne. His work is included in the collections of both the [[Irish Museum of Modern Art]] and [[Arts Council of Ireland|The Arts Council of Ireland]].

References

External links
 A Venn Notebook
 Galerie Christian Lethert
 Arts Council of Ireland collections list

1968 births
20th-century Irish painters
21st-century Irish painters
Irish male painters
Living people
Artists from Dublin (city)
20th-century Irish male artists